Kathleen Senior High School is the second oldest of four high schools in Lakeland, Florida, United States.  It was originally housed north of its present location, at the site of the current Kathleen Middle School.

Notable alumni
 Desmond Clark, former National Football League (NFL) tight end
 Dominique Davis, NFL quarterback (Atlanta Falcons)
 Paul Edinger, former American football kicker in the National Football League (NFL)
 Kenneth Gant, former NFL safety and special teams player for the Dallas Cowboys
 Ray Lewis, former NFL linebacker for the Baltimore Ravens
 Alan Mills, Major League Baseball pitcher (1990–2001)
 Freddie Mitchell, former NFL wide receiver for the Philadelphia Eagles
 Chris Richard, professional basketball forward
 Forrest Sawyer, Emmy Award-winning journalist
 Donnell Smith, former NFL player for the Green Bay Packers and New England Patriots
 Ronnie Smith, former wide receiver for the Los Angeles Rams, San Diego Chargers and Philadelphia Eagles

References 

Schools in Lakeland, Florida
High schools in Polk County, Florida
Public high schools in Florida
Educational institutions established in 1928
1928 establishments in Florida